The Uerdingen railbus (German: Uerdinger Schienenbus) is the common term for the multiple units which were developed by the German firm of Waggonfabrik Uerdingen for the Deutsche Bundesbahn and private railways after the Second World War. These vehicles were diesel-powered, twin-axle railbuses of light construction. The diesel motors were built into the chassis underneath the vehicle. The VT 95 (later DB Class 795) and VT 98 (later DB Class 798) of the former Deutsche Bundesbahn in particular, are associated with this concept. These vehicles were employed in passenger train duties on branch lines where steam or diesel train operations were less profitable. Including the units built under licence, a total of 1,492 power cars were built from 1950 to 1971; and the total number of units, including trailer and driving cars, was 3,306.

The majority of these vehicles were built by the Waggonfabrik Uerdingen.

The railbus, much loved by passengers, was also nicknamed the Rote Brummer (Red Buzzer) because of the loud noise it made when driving. In North Germany the railbus was also often known as the Ferkeltaxe (Piglet Taxi). Amongst railway fans it was also called the Retter der Nebenbahnen (Branch Line Saviour).

Classes

Prototypes 
They were braked using a foot brake and had double doors. The prototypes were given operating numbers VT 95 901 to 911 and 912, the latter was soon renumbered to VT 95 9112 because of its longer wheelbase. Suitable trailer cars were also placed in service.

VT 95 series (Class 795, single motor) 
The VT 95.9 was developed based on the experience gained with the prototypes and was delivered in 1952 by Waggonfabrik Uerdingen. 557 single-motored Class VT 95.9 units were built, as well as 564 Class VB 142 trailer cars and 60 two-wheeled railbus trailers for the transportation of luggage.

Its furnishings are very simple and resemble those in a bus (hence the name Schienenbus or railbus): one large open coach shared also by the engine driver, seats which can be folded two-ways depending on the direction of travel and simple lighting from bare light bulbs with no covers. The production vehicles were braked using a driver's brake valve.

The vehicles had a Büssing motor and six gears.
They had scharfenberg couplers and Stoßfederbügel instead of buffers.

15 VT 95 railbuses and 15 VB 142 trailer cars were delivered to the railways in Saarland in 1956. They were painted in DB red livery with the inscription SAAR. On the annexation of the Saarland into the Federal Republic of Germany these railbuses were taken over by the Bundesbahn.

In 1968 the vehicles were reclassified into Class 795 (power car) and Class 995 (trailer car).

Contrary to usual operating practice the VT 95 could also be coupled to two VB 142 trailers.

VT 98 series (Classes 798 and BR 796, two motors) 
The VT 98.9 evolved from the VT 95.9 which, with its single motor, was too underpowered for many lines. The VT 98.9 was therefore fitted with two driving motors. Because this variant of the railbus was fitted with normal buffer and screw couplings, it could haul other types of wagon or be placed at the end of other trains hauled by other locomotives.

Büssing Type 10 underfloor motors were installed in all units, the same engine as those on the Büssing Type D2U double-decker buses used in Berlin. The six-way gearbox was supplied by ZF Friedrichshafen.

In addition to the 329 power cars, 220 VB 98 trailer cars with luggage compartments, 100 VB 98s without luggage compartments and 321 VS 98 driving cars were produced. In the DB they were mainly used in a VT+VB+VS configuration. However, there were also two-unit VT+VS formations as well as longer rakes of up to six units: VT+VB+VS+VT+VB+VS. In 1968 they were reclassified into Class 798, the trailers became 998.0-3 and driving cars 998.6-9. On the latter the serial numbers were increased by 600 (e.g. VS 98 001 became 998 601-9).

A few VT were modernised and were given a special white and mint green livery. These railbuses worked in Chiemgau (Aschau–Prien), as did the vehicles of the Ulmer Spatz. Otherwise the railbuses were painted in red, the typical DB colour for motive power units.

In 1988 47 power cars, 23 trailer cars and 43 driving cars were converted for one-man operation. They were given pneumatic door-closing equipment and a ticket counter for the engine driver. These railbuses were redesignated as Class 796.

Special class VT 97.9 (Class 797, rack railway vehicle) 
Eight power cars were designed as rack railway engines and designated as Class VT 97.9; the six driving cars as VS 97 001 to 97 006. The VTs were used on the Honau–Lichtenstein rack railway in the Swabian Jura and, from 1964 to 1965, VT 97 901 was even employed in goods duties on the Passau–Wegscheid line due to the lack of suitable locomotives. After the closure of rack railway routes the cogwheel drive was removed. The vehicles were once more designated as VT 97.9 or from 1968 as 797. Their area of operations included the branch line from  Göppingen to Boll (the Voralbbahn), until this line was closed on 27 May 1989.

Operations with the Deutsche Bahn

Passenger services 
These railbuses were used on almost every branch line and for feeder services on many main lines in the Deutsche Bundesbahn and from 1994 Deutsche Bahn network.

Its last regular work on passenger services with the Deutsche Bahn AG finished in 2000 at Bahnbetriebswerk Tübingen. These were twin-motored VT 98.9 versions, most of the single-motored VT 95.9 units had already been retired by 1980. In Köln-Nippes a 795 was still being used until 1983 for railway workers.

Departmental vehicles 
Many Uerdingen railbuses were converted into railway departmental vehicles. For example, the prototype VT 95 906 was converted into an Indusi measurement car (and redesignated as DB Class 724). It was operated out of the signalling workshop at Wuppertal.

Other converted Uerdingen railbuses are sometimes used today as cars for rail testing, track measurement and LZB measurement, and as tool vans or signalling maintenance vehicles.

Museum vehicles 
Many of these robust and well-loved railbuses were sold to railway societies and museums, and are still working today in museum duties.

For example, railbuses are still used by the Deutsche Bahn, even if the actual vehicles are provided by railway societies. One multiple is painted in Regionalbahn colours and runs on summer weekends for tourists on the Schwäbische Albbahn and the Ulm–Sigmaringen railway between Ulm Hauptbahnhof and Kleinengstingen. These trains run in the timetable as an entirely normal Regionalbahn service; The first car has a plate on it with the notice "im Auftrag der DB" (under contract to the DB). To be consistent, all the normal DB local fares (and at times the NALDO and DING combined fares) apply. The former Chiemgaubahn railbuses, which were painted in white and mint green, are used for this, along with others. This formation is also called the Ulmer Spatz.

Other vehicles are in service with the:
 Bochum-Dahlhausen Railway Museum, 
 Passau Railway Society (Passauer Eisenbahnfreunde), 
 German Steam Locomotive Museum,
 Bavarian Railway Museum, 
 Upper Hessian Railway Society (Oberhessische Eisenbahnfreunde e. V.), 
 Historic Railway, Frankfurt, 
 Alme Valley Forest Railway (Waldbahn Almetal),
 Railbus Society (Hönnetaler Eisenbahnfreunde),
 Rodachtalbahn from Steinwiesen to Nordhalben.
 Cologne-Bonn Railway Society (Köln-Bonner Eisenbahn-Freunde or KBEF)
 South Limburg Steam Train Society (Zuid-Limburgse Stoomtrein Maatschappij)
 Zollernbahn Railway Society (Eisenbahnfreunde Zollernbahn)
 Seelze Railbus Society (IG Schienenbus Seelze or ISS)

Uerdingen railbuses are also owned by the
 Nuremberg Transport Museum - one VT 95 rake and one VT 98 rake,
 Deutsches Technikmuseum in Berlin - a VT 98 exhibit,
 Historic Motor Locomotive Working Group (Arbeitsgemeinschaft Historische Brennkraftlokomotiven) - a steel-sprung VT 98,
 Honau-Lichtenstein Rack Railway Society (Freunde der Zahnradbahn Honau–Lichtenstein) - two VT 97s,
 Hamm Railway Society - one of the few still working VT 95 railbuses on long loan to the Freundeskreis für Eisenbahnen, Münster,
 DGEG at Bochum-Dahlhausen - a VT 95 in extremely poor condition after a shunting accident,
 Pfalzbahn GmbH - 2 VT 98, 1 trailer and 1 driving car with office.

Gallery

German private railways 

Many private railways have bought second-hand Uerdingen railbuses from the Deutsche Bahn. The Hersfelder Kreisbahn procure new ones, though, including a three-unit set with rubber corridor connectors and gangways. Used cars of this type were employed, inter alia by the Elbe-Weser Railway and Transport Company and the AKN Railway for local services.

In 1993 the Düren Kreisbahn (DKB) bought ten VT 98, modernised them, painted them blue and white and placed them in service on the Rurtalbahn until their duties were subsumed by  RegioSprinters in 1995.
The Vt 203 was sold by the Düren Kreisbahn to the Hümmlinger Kreisbahn museum railway. The museums is refurbishing the railbus to make it operational again, giving it the DB number 798 514, and will work it between Werlte and Lathen.

Other second-hand VT 98s were bought by the Prignitz Railway– both from Deutsche Bahn and the DKB – painted in a blue andred livery and used on lines in Brandenburg and Mecklenburg-Vorpommern. Since  2003 the railbuses have been replaced however by Regio-Shuttle RS1s; only one power car (T11) is still working and available for specials.
At present the Deutsche Regionaleisenbahn works the Düben-Heide Railway between Wittenberg and Bad Schmiedeberg with a railbus running scheduled services.

Export 

 Luxembourg: The Chemins de Fer Luxembourgeois (CFL) bought ten prototype power cars with trailers. One set is used as a museum train at the museum railway of the Industry and Railway Park Fond-de-Gras in Luxembourg.
 Austria: The Austrian Federal Railways (ÖBB) also used these railbuses, the 5081. These were also procured by the Montafonerbahn Bludenz–Schruns and the Graz-Köflach Railway. After buying a small batch they were made under licence by Simmering-Graz-Pauker and the Jenbacher Werke.
 Other vehicles were delivered to Yugoslavia and operated by the JŽ (SFRY), where they were known as the Šinobus or JŽ class 812. Originally 40 were imported German railbuses, while 270 units were produced under licence by GOŠA. These vehicles were inherited by their successor companies (see the HŽ series 7221). Several were still used regularly until 2016 in Serbia. (see the ŽS series 812)
 Several multiple-units were delivered to Spain.
 Turkey: Units retired by the Deutsche Bahn were sold to the Turkish State Railways (TCDD) as RM3000.

Successor 
The Uerdingen railbus's successor from the end of the 1980s was the Class 628, which is still in widespread use today, although it is being largely replaced by more the modern multiples like the Bombardier Talent, Alstom LHB Coradia LINT and Siemens Desiro.

See also 
 KiHa 01/03: Japanese derivative; largely based on VT98.

References

Sources 

 Rolf Löttgers: Der Uerdinger Schienenbus – Nebenbahnretter und Exportschlager. Franckh's Eisenbahnbibliothek, Franckh'sche Verlagshandlung, Stuttgart 1985, 
 Die Schienenbusse der DB – VT 95/98. EK-Spezial. EK Verlag, Freiburg 1990
 Jörg Hajt: Abschied vom Schienenbus. Heel Verlag, Königswinter 1998, 
 50 Jahre Uerdinger Schienenbus. Eisenbahnkurier Special 56. EK Verlag, Freiburg 2000
 Malte Werning: Schienenbusse - VT 95–VT 98: Triebwagen-Veteranen der 50er Jahre. GeraMond 2001. 
 Jürgen-Ulrich Ebel, Josef Högemann, Rolf Löttgers: Schienenbusse aus Uerdingen. Bd. 1., Technik und Geschichte bei DB, Privatbahnen und im Ausland.EK-Verlag, Freiburg 2001, 
 Jürgen-Ulrich Ebel, Josef Högemann, Rolf Löttgers: Schienenbusse aus Uerdingen. Bd. 2., Einsatzgeschichte der Baureihen VT 95, VT 97 und VT 98. EK-Verlag, Freiburg 2002, 
 Jürgen Krantz, Roland Meier: Alles über den Schienenbus. transpress Verlag, Stuttgart 2007,

External links 

 „Die Nebenbahnretter“
 Photos of the VT95 (BR 795) in the European railway picture gallery
 Photos of the VT98 (BR 798) the European railway picture gallery
 www.roter-brummer.de Extensive information on German railbuses
 Ulm Spatz
 www.fsbmenden.de Menden Railbus Society (Förderverein Schienenbus Menden)
 Historical Motor Locomotive Working Group (Arbeitsgemeinschaft Historische Brennkraftlokomotiven)
 The Kasbach Valley railway (Kasbachtalbahn) in Rhineland-Palatinate
 Seelze Railbus Society (Interessengemeinschaft Schienenbus Seelze) 
 Audio CD, includes an MP3 sample of a Class 796 unit's noise.

Diesel multiple units of Germany
German railbuses
Duewag